Intoxication (German: Rausch) is a 1919 German silent drama film directed by Ernst Lubitsch and starring Asta Nielsen, Alfred Abel and Karl Meinhardt. It was based on the play Brott och brott by August Strindberg, which was later remade as the 1928 film Sin. Lubitsch was loaned out from UFA to the smaller Argus-Film for the production.

Plot
Gaston finally succeeds as a dramatist and decides to leave his wife and child for another woman. When the child dies, the finger is pointed at him, and he winds up as a destitute before all is revealed.

Cast
 Asta Nielsen as Henriette Mauclerc 
 Alfred Abel as Gaston, ein Schriftsteller 
 Karl Meinhardt as Adolph 
 Grete Diercks as Jeanne 
 Rudolf Klein-Rhoden as Untersuchungsrichter 
 Frida Richard as  Haushälterin 
 Marga Köhler as Henriettes Mutter 
 Sophie Pagay as Mutter Kathrin 
 Heinz Stieda as Der Abbé

References

Bibliography
 Eyman, Scott. Ernst Lubitsch: Laughter in Paradise. Johns Hopkins University Press, 2000.
 Hake, Sabine. Passions and Deceptions: The Early Films of Ernst Lubitsch. Princeton University Press, 1992.

External links

1919 films
Films of the Weimar Republic
German silent feature films
1919 drama films
German drama films
Films directed by Ernst Lubitsch
German films based on plays
German black-and-white films
Films based on works by August Strindberg
Silent drama films
1910s German films